The 1935–36 Divizia A was the twenty-fourth season of Divizia A, the top-level football league of Romania.

Teams

League table

Results

Promotion / relegation play-off

Top goalscorers

Champion squad

See also 

1935–36 Divizia B

References

Liga I seasons
Romania
1935–36 in Romanian football